Muhammad Ali fought three professional boxing matches against Ken Norton between 1973 and 1976. Ali won the series 2–1, though the final fight (judged a unanimous decision in Ali's favor) was highly controversial.

First match
Still rebuilding a winning record after his first professional loss to Joe Frazier, Ali faced Norton on March 31, 1973, at the Sports Arena, San Diego, California. The fight was aired live on free TV in the United States via ABC. The fight against Norton started a years-long rivalry. Ali was outmaneuvered by Norton's unorthodox fighting style, which involved jabbing from below and crossing his hands for defence. As the final bell rang, Norton won on a split decision, igniting a controversy in the boxing world. Soon after the fight, Ali was treated in hospital for a broken jaw, an injury sustained in the second round of the fight.

Second match
On September 10, 1973, Ali and Norton met at the Forum, Inglewood, California, USA, for their highly anticipated rematch. Norton was in superb shape going into the second fight while Ali took to training at his training camp in Deer Lake, Pennsylvania, where he "sought to whip his once Adonis-like physique back into shape."

As the fight began, both Ali and Norton appeared in shape and energetic. However, Ali demonstrated his physical stamina by skipping without pause and standing between rounds. Norton came out aggressively in the beginning of the fifth round, leading with a barrage of jabs and pushing Ali to a more defensive posture.

In the final round, Ali dominated with a series of combinations. Though the match was close, Ali ended up winning the split with 2 votes to 1. Although Ali had demonstrated the physical stamina for which he had become known, he admitted, "I'm tireder than usual, because of my age."

Third match
Ali and Norton met for the third and last time on September 28, 1976, at Yankee Stadium, Bronx, New York, USA, completing their trilogy. This time, 34-year-old Ali entered the ring as Heavyweight Champion, making the eighth defense of his title since his victory over George Foreman in 1974. Both fighters showed their strengths, but neither established themselves as the obvious winner. Most commentators gave the fight to Norton. Ultimately, Ali won by a unanimous decision, thereby retaining his title. Ali said during an interview with Mark Cronin in October of 1976: "Kenny’s style is too difficult for me. I can’t beat him, and I sure don’t want to fight him again. I honestly thought he beat me in Yankee Stadium, but the judges gave it to me, and I’m grateful to them." Norton was bitter, stating after the fight: "I won at least nine or ten rounds. I was robbed."

Overall, Ali landed 199 of 709 punches while Norton landed 286 of 635 punches, per Bob Canobbio's CompuBox statistics. Norton both landed more punches and had far better accuracy (45% vs 28%). Norton also landed 192 power punches to Ali's 128.

References

External links
 Muhammad Ali vs. Ken Norton - Full Fight September 10, 1973 (Video)

Norton
1973 in boxing
1976 in boxing
March 1973 sports events in the United States
September 1973 sports events in the United States
September 1976 sports events in the United States